Isocossus vandeldeni is a moth in the family Cossidae. It is found on Peninsular Malaysia, Sumatra and Borneo. The habitat consists of lowland forests.

The forewings are uniform striate bone-grey.

References

Natural History Museum Lepidoptera generic names catalog

Cossinae
Moths described in 1957
Moths of Asia